John King was president of the Los Angeles, California, Common Council—the legislative arm of that city— effective June 1, 1868. He replaced Murray Morrison, who resigned. In 1865 he served a term on the county grand jury.

His terms of service on the council were:

 May 10, 1866, to May 8, 1867. Reinstated August 8, 1867.
 August 8, 1867, to December 7, 1868.
 December 9, 1868, to December 9, 1869. He was chosen as president by the drawing of lots. 
 December 9, 1869, to December 9, 1870.

Political party

He was a Democrat, but King was also a delegate to an Unconditional Union county convention in Los Angeles on August 5, 1861, "for the purpose of selecting, nominating, and adopting such measures as will secure the  election of Union candidates for County offices."

Bella Union Hotel

King was at one time the manager of the historic Bella Union Hotel, and in 1862, he formed a partnership with Henry Hammill to lease and again operate the hostelry. A June 4, 1862, article in the Semi-Weekly Southern News said of the affair that: "We are pleased to notice the fact that a large American flag has been hoisted over the house, and we hope that the stigma which has been attached to [it] . . . will be removed, as the present proprietors, though fully realizing their duties as landlords are sound Unionists."

The partnership was dissolved in February 1865, with King retaining ownership on his own.

References

Notes

Data is from Chronological Record of Los Angeles City Officials, 1850-1938, compiled under direction of Municipal Reference Library, City Hall, Los Angeles (March 1938, reprinted 1966). "Prepared ... as a report on Project No. SA 3123-5703-6077-8121-9900 conducted under the auspices of the Works Progress Administration."

Los Angeles Common Council (1850–1889) members
Year of birth missing
Year of death missing
19th-century American politicians